Ituxi River is a river of Amazonas state in north-western Brazil. It is a tributary of the Purus River.

Course

It originates near Acrelândia in the state of Acre.
It is a blackwater river that flows through the  Ituxi Extractive Reserve, created in 2008, in a northeast direction.

See also
List of rivers of Acre
List of rivers of Amazonas (Brazilian state)

References

Rivers of Acre (state)
Rivers of Amazonas (Brazilian state)